Pat Paulsen's Half a Comedy Hour is an American half-hour television variety show that ran on ABC-TV on Thursday nights at 7:30 p.m. from January 22, 1970 to April 16, 1970.

The star was Pat Paulsen, who ran for the office of President of the United States in 1968. Paulsen had been a regular on The Smothers Brothers Comedy Hour. Jean Byron was a semi-regular. Writers included Steve Martin.

Paulsen often spoofed Then Came Bronson and played a science teacher. Guest stars included Hubert Humphrey, Angie Dickinson, Tiny Tim, Miss Vickie, Mike Connors, Dan Blocker, Henry Fonda, Tommy Smothers, Don Rickles, Don Adams, Carl Betz, the animated Daffy Duck and Foghorn Leghorn and Joey Heatherton. On the April 9, 1970 episode, Paulsen sang the song "Did I Ever Really Live?", which was from his Mercury record album, Live at the Ice House.

The show was cancelled after 13 episodes.

MPI put the entire series out on DVD in 2009.

The series is available on Amazon Prime Video and Tubi.

References 

TV.COM
MPI DVD sleeve notes
TV GUIDE, 1970 issues

External links 
Paulsen.com

1970 American television series debuts
1970 American television series endings
1970s American sketch comedy television series
1970s American variety television series
American Broadcasting Company original programming